Joshua Klumb is an American politician, businessman, and farmer serving as a member of the South Dakota Senate from the 20th district. Elected in 2016, he assumed office on January 10, 2017.

Klumb earned a Bachelor of Science degree in business and marketing from Oklahoma Wesleyan University. He was born in Mount Vernon, South Dakota.

References 

Living people
People from Davison County, South Dakota
Republican Party South Dakota state senators
Oklahoma Wesleyan University alumni
21st-century American politicians
Year of birth missing (living people)